Persatuan Sepakbola Bangkinang dan Sekitarnya (simply known as PSBS Bangkinang) is an Indonesian football club based in Kampar Regency, Riau. They currently compete in the Liga 3.

References

External links
 PSBS Bangkinang Kampar Instagram

Football clubs in Indonesia
Football clubs in Riau
Association football clubs established in 1959
1959 establishments in Indonesia